Željko Kopić (born 10 September 1977) is a Croatian football manager and former player.

Playing career

Club
In his playing days, Željko Kopić played as a midfielder. He played in the younger age categories of NK Osijek and GNK Dinamo Zagreb. In his senior career, he played for Croatian clubs NK Čakovec, NK Marsonia and NK Hrvatski Dragovoljac and an Australian club Sydney United 58 FC.

Managerial career
After his playing career, Željko Kopić became a coach. In 2006, he received the UEFA B coaching diploma, and since 2013 he has the UEFA PRO coaching diploma. At the beginning of his coaching career, he worked at the football school of NK Hrvatski Dragovoljac, and later became an assistant coach of the first team.

His first independent job in senior football was NK Zagorec from Krapina, after which he took over HNK Segesta from Sisak. Then, he worked first as an assistant, and later as the first coach at NK Lučko, which was then playing in the 1st HNL. After that, he worked for a short time in Cibalia. In June 2014, he became the coach of NK Zagreb.

Towards the beginning of the next season, he became the coach of Slaven Belupo from Koprivnica, where he stayed for 96 games and became the longest-serving coach in the 110-year-old history of the club. With Slaven Belupo he played the final of the Croatian Football Cup against GNK Dinamo Zagreb. He left them in October 2017.

On November 13, 2017, he was named as the new Hajduk Split manager. In 34 official matches at Hajduk, he achieved 6 consecutive victories away from home and 6 consecutive victories in the national league and cup.

In October 2018, he was appointed coach of the Cypriot first league side Pafos FC, where he won the Coach of the Month award and achieved significant victories against the big Cypriot clubs such as Apoel, Omonia and AEK.

Upon his return to Croatia, he became the academy director of Dinamo Zagreb's football school, which is known as one of the best football schools in the world. In December 2021, after the departure of Damir Krznar, he was appointed as the coach of the first team and is only the seventh coach to lead the two biggest Croatian clubs, Dinamo and Hajduk.  With Dinamo, he achieved 7 consecutive victories in the HNL and European competitions, among which the 0:1 victory against West Ham and the 1:0 victory against Sevilla in the knockout phase of the Europa League stand out the most. 

The victory against West Ham was the first victory of a Croatian club against an English side on their home ground in the history of Croatian club football.

In August 2022, Željko Kopić became the coach of the Bulgarian first division side Botev Plovdiv and during his engagement, which lasted four months, he raised the club from the last place in the table to the 10th place.

Managerial statistics

References

External links
 

1977 births
Living people
Footballers from Osijek
Association football midfielders
Croatian footballers
NK Čakovec players
NK Marsonia players
Sydney United 58 FC players
NK Hrvatski Dragovoljac players
Croatian Football League players
Croatian expatriate footballers
Expatriate soccer players in Australia
Croatian expatriate sportspeople in Australia
Croatian football managers
HNK Segesta managers
NK Lučko managers
HNK Cibalia managers
NK Zagreb managers
NK Slaven Belupo managers
HNK Hajduk Split managers
Pafos FC managers
GNK Dinamo Zagreb managers
Botev Plovdiv managers
Croatian expatriate football managers
Expatriate football managers in Cyprus
Croatian expatriate sportspeople in Cyprus
Expatriate football managers in Bulgaria
Croatian expatriate sportspeople in Bulgaria